This is a list of sovereign states or polities that existed in the 3rd century BC.

Political entities

See also
List of Bronze Age states
List of Iron Age states
List of Classical Age states
List of states during Late Antiquity
List of states during the Middle Ages

References

-03
3rd century BC-related lists